Cornelius H. Mack (September 1, 1885 – August 22, 1958) was a Rear Admiral in the United States Navy. He served as the Chief of the United States Navy Dental Corps for a brief time in 1922, and was the first dental officer to be permanently promoted to Rear Admiral.

Early life and education
Cornelius Henry Mack was born in West Springfield, Massachusetts on 1 September 1885. He graduated first from West Springfield High School, and then from the Harvard University Dental School in 1906 with a Doctor of Dental Medicine. He joined the recently formed United States Navy Dental Corps on 2 March 1914.

Military career

Cornelius Mack's first military assignment was as an assistant dental surgeon at the United States Naval Academy, where he served until he was reassigned to the 6th Marine Regiment out of Quantico. He was with this unit when it was deployed to France during World War I.

Combat service during World War I
While attached to the 6th Marines, Cornelius H. Mack saw combat several times on the western front, most notably during the Battle of Belleau Wood, and the Battle of Soissons. He is credited with continuing to care for and evacuate the wounded despite coming under attack multiple times, and with other displays of gallantry. For his actions in these battles, Cornelius H. Mack was awarded the Navy Cross, multiple Citation Stars, three of which were later upgraded to the Silver Star. He was also awarded the Croix de Guerre with Gold Star

Suffering from both acute gas inhalation and the 1918 influenza, Cornelius H. Mack was medically evacuated from the front lines on 20 July 1918. He remained assigned to the 6th Marines until September the following year, when he was reassigned to the USS Pennsylvania (BB-38). From there, he was assigned to a variety of both sea and shore tours of duty, including overseas duty in the Philippines and China, and also served as a clinical professor of oral surgery at New York University.

On 15 June 1932, he received an Honorary Doctor of Laws (LL.D) from the College of the Holy Cross. In 1936, Cornelius H. Mack, along with many other officers including Alexander G. Lyle, filed suit in the United States Court of Claims over a pay dispute. Citing the 1935 W. W. Hargrave v. The United States decision, the Court awarded Mack $1370.05, .

Cornelius H. Mack was transferred to the retired list on 1 September 1943, and promoted to Rear Admiral on that date. He continued to serve on active duty until November 1945 due to World War II.

Cornelius H. Mack died on 22 August 1958 in Largo, Florida, and was interred in Arlington National Cemetery.

Notes
: Alexander Gordon Lyle was the first dental officer to be promoted to Rear Admiral, but this advancement was temporary in nature. Compare the entries for Cornelius Henry Mack on page 674 to Alexander Gordon Lyle's entry on page 381 of the 1944 Register of the Commissioned and Warrant Officers of the United States Navy and Marine Corps and Reserve Officers on Active Duty.
: As the Silver Star medal was first introduced in 1932, none of the awards Cornelius H. Mack received in 1918 were Silver Stars. Rather, he was awarded several Citation Stars, some of which were later upgraded to the Silver Star. A History of Dentistry in the U.S. Army to World War II credits Cornelius H. Mack with 6 Army citation stars, and The Medical Department of the United States Navy with the Army and Marine Corps in France in World War I includes the full  text of 6 citations for the same. However, Cornelius Mack's headstone is engraved "SS & 2 OLC" meaning, "Silver Star and 2 Oak Leaf Clusters" which indicates three awards. Additionally, Cornelius H. Mack's official Naval biography credits Mack with 3 Silver Stars, and the Victory Medal with 5 Citation Stars. This indicates 8 total awards, with Mack either not electing or not being eligible to upgrade 5 of them. Note that the first two sources discussed in this section explicitly state that 6 awards were Army citation stars, which were eligible for upgrade.
: Cornelius H. Macks' official biography states that he was awarded this honorary Doctor of Laws in 1933, however, the university's 1931–1932 catalog shows that he received the degree on the 15 June 1932 commencement, as does the "News" section of the Journal of the American Dental Association's August 1932 issue.

References

1885 births
1958 deaths
People from West Springfield, Massachusetts
Harvard School of Dental Medicine alumni
American dentists
Military personnel from Massachusetts
United States Navy personnel of World War I
Recipients of the Navy Cross (United States)
Recipients of the Croix de Guerre 1914–1918 (France)
Recipients of the Silver Star
United States Navy rear admirals (upper half)
20th-century American naval officers
Burials at Arlington National Cemetery
20th-century dentists